Cryptotomus roseus, the bluelip parrotfish, is a species of marine ray-finned fish, a parrotfish, in the family Scaridae. It is found in the warmer waters of the western Atlantic Ocean. The bluelip parrotfish typically inhabits seagrass beds. It is a protogynous hermaphrodite.

References

External links

Scaridae
Taxa named by Edward Drinker Cope
Fish described in 1871
Fish of the Dominican Republic